Sophie's Misfortunes is a children's book written by the Countess of Ségur. The book was published in 1858 by the publisher Hachette. The illustrations were by Horace Castelli, a French artist. This is the first book of a trilogy; its sequels are Good Little Girls (1858) and The Holidays (1859).

Plot
The story is set in a castle in the French countryside, during the Second French Empire. Sophie is a naughty little girl who lives with her parents, Monsieur and Madame de Réan.

Legacy 
The success of Sophie's Misfortunes has been constant through the years and still goes on today; the book has been republished many times. Overseas, as well, it has been very successful. Vladimir Nabokov alluded to it in his novel Ada (1969), making up a novel called Sophie's Sophisms [Les Sophismes de Sophie] by a so-called "Miss Stopchin", as well Les Malheurs de Swann, a title which combines Countess of Ségur and Marcel Proust. In the United Kingdom, the book was used as reference material to teach young girls French translation (boys would be trained using  L'Histoire d'un conscrit de 1813, written by Erckmann-Chatrian).

Main characters
 Sophie de Réan
 Monsieur and Madame de Réan, Sophie's parents
 Paul d'Auber, Sophie's cousin
 Camille and Madeleine de Fleurville, Sophie's friends

Adaptations

Cinema and television
The book has inspired numerous film and television adaptations, including:
 Sophie's Misfortunes (1946), by Jacqueline Audry.
 Sophie's Misfortunes (1979), by Jean-Claude Brialy.
 Sophie's Misfortunes (2016), by Christophe Honoré.

Music 
 In 1935, French composer Jean Françaix wrote a ballet called Les Malheurs de Sophie (32 minutes, published by Schott).

 Les Bonheurs de Sophie, piano sheet music by Chantal Auber, La Pléiade, Préparatoire 1.

 "Les Malheurs de Sophie", sung by Chantal Goya, a song from the movie made by Jean-Claude Brialy. 

 Les Malheurs de Sophie (2011), a musical by Virginie Aguzzoli.

Animation
 Trouble With Sophie (1997) is the only animated adaptation of Sophie's Misfortune. Information about this series is limited and the voice cast is practically unknown since they were never credited. The series was developed by Alya Animation and aired on France 3. There are 27 episodes in total. It shows the titular character, Sophie’s life from when she was a child to adulthood and the hardships throughout her life. The series now has many different YouTube channels with all the episodes. There is the original French dub but the English dub also has its own channel. The tv series also tells the stories of the sequel books ‘Good Little Girls’ and ‘The Hoildays’in it. Making it a full story of Sophie's life. And an entire adaptation of the ‘Fleurville Trilogy’

Notes and references

 Les Nouveaux Malheurs de Sophie, a novel by Valérie Dayre
  Les Malheurs de Sophie, audio version (in French)

1858 French novels
1850s children's books
French novels adapted into films
French children's novels
French novels adapted into television shows
Novels adapted into ballets